Eugênia Anna Santos (Mãe Aninha, Oba Biyi; Salvador, Bahia, 13 July 1869 - Salvador, 3 January 1938) was a Brazilian Iyalorixá. She founded the candomblé Ilê Axé Opó Afonjá in Salvador, now considered a National Historic Landmark, and in Rio de Janeiro.

Life
Santos was born in 1869 to African parents of the Gurunsi nation.

Legacy
Santos is remembered for her great leadership qualities and strength. Author Kim Butler states that she "went further than any other priest in transforming the  into an alternative, African world in the heart of Brazil", which "reflected ways in which the candomblé community was part of the larger Afro-Bahaian community". Darlene Clark Hine and Jacqueline McLeod credit her with moving the " out of the shadows by opening the doors of her  to the international community".

The Municipal School Eugenia Anna dos Santos was established in her name in 1978 for nursery children aged 6 months to 5 years, and from 1986, for elementary children from 1st to 4th grade.

References

Sources

Bibliography 
 JOAQUIM, Maria Salete. O papel da liderança religiosa feminina na construção da identidade negra. Pallas Editora. 2001. 187 p. . (in Portuguese)
 LIMA, Vivaldo da Costa. O candomblé da Bahia na década de 30. Vol. 18, pp. 201–221. 2004. (in Portuguese)
 LIMA, Vivaldo da Costa. A família de santo nos candomblés jejes-nagôs da Bahia: um estudo de relações intragrupais. Português. ed.2a. Salvador. Corrupio. 2003. 216 p. . (in Portuguese)
 LIMA, Vivaldo da Costa. Lessé Orixá, nos pés do santo. Editora Corrupio. Salvador. 2010. . (in Portuguese)
 MARIANO, Agnes; QUEIROZ, Aline. Obàrayi - Babalorixá Balbino Daniel de Paula. 2009. Barabô. . (in Portuguese)
 OLIVEIRA, Waldir Freitas. As pesquisas na Bahia sobre os afro-brasileiros. (in Portuguese)
 PIERSON, Donald. Negroes In Brazil: A Study of Race Contact at Bahia. The University of Chicago Press. p. 392. 1942.
 PRANDI, Reginaldo. Segredos Guardados: Orixás na Alma Brasileira. Companhia das Letras. 2005. . (in Portuguese)
 ROCHA, Agenor Miranda. As Nações Kêtu: origens, ritos e crenças: os candomblés antigos do Rio de Janeiro. 2a-edição. MAUAD Editora Ltda. 2000. 112p. . (in Portuguese)
 ROCHA, Agenor Miranda. Caminhos de Odu. 2a ed. Rio de Janeiro. Pallas. 1999. . (in Portuguese)
 SANTANA, Marcos. Mãe Aninha de Afonjá: um mito afro-baiano. Português. ed.1a. Salvador. EGBA. 2006. 100 p. . (in Portuguese)
 SANTOS, Maria Stella de Azevedo. Meu Tempo é Agora. São Paulo. Editora Oduduwa. 1993. (in Portuguese)
 SANTOS, Deoscóredes Maximiliano dos. História de Um Terreiro Nagô. 2a.edição. Editora Max Limonad. 1988. (in Portuguese)

1869 births
1938 deaths
People from Salvador, Bahia
Brazilian Candomblés
Founders of new religious movements
Women founders